Shi Yinhong (born March 1951) is a Chinese political scientist and International Relations (IR) scholar. He is a Distinguished Professor of IR, Chairman of the Academic Committee of the School of International Studies, and Director of the Centre on American Studies at Renmin University of China. He has served as a counselor of the State Council of China since February 2011.

Academic career 
Shi obtained a Master's degree in History the U.S. Foreign Relations at Nanjing University in 1981 and a Ph.D. in International History at the same institution in 1988. He was a visiting fellow at Harvard-Yenching Institute at Harvard University (1983-1984), Federal Institute for Eastern European and International Studies in Cologne (1992), and University of North Carolina at Chapel Hill (1995-1996). 

He was a Professor of International History at Nanjing University (1993-1998) and a Professor of IR and Director of the Center for International Strategic Studies at International Relations Academy, Nanjing (1998-2001).

References 

Chinese international relations scholars

1951 births
Living people